Jiaozi may refer to 
 Jiaozi, a kind of Chinese dumplings.
 Jiaozi (currency), Chinese banknote in the 10th century.
 Litter (vehicle), known in Chinese as Jiaozi
 Jiaozi Snow Mountain, in northern central Yunnan, China
 Jiaozi, Chinese director best known for Ne Zha (2019).

See also
 Jiaozhi